Zafar ul Islam Khan Ex. Chairman of Delhi Minority Commission, author and journalist based in New Delhi. He is currently editor and publisher of The Milli Gazette fortnightly focusing on issues concerning the Muslim community. He is also the founder and chairman of Charity Alliance, an organisation involved in relief and welfare work in India.

Birth and Education
Khan was born in Badhariya Azamgarh, India, in March 1948. He is the son of Maulana Wahiduddin Khan, a Muslim thinker who ran the Al Risala/Islamic Center in New Delhi. His primary education was at Madrasa-tul-Islah, a madrasah in Azamgarh, and Darul Uloom Nadwatul Ulama, Lucknow. Later he studied at Al-Azhar and Cairo University during 1966–73. He obtained his PhD in Islamic Studies from the University of Manchester in 1987.

Career 
In the 1970s he worked with the Libyan Foreign Ministry as translator-editor. In the 1980s he was with the London-based The Muslim Institute, running their MuslimMedia newsservice and other publications. The Muslim Institute went on to form the Muslim Parliament, an informal body of leading British Muslims. He is author and translator of over 50 books in Arabic, English and Urdu including "Hijrah in Islam" (Delhi, 1996) and Palestine Documents (New Delhi 1998). He has contributed eight articles to the Encyclopaedia of Islam (Leiden) on Indo-Muslim themes. He is a regular commentator on Islamic and South Asian issues on radio and TV channels, including Al Jazeera and BBC Arabic and his writings appear in Arabic newspapers and magazines. In 2000, Khan started Milli Gazette, an English Language fortnightly compact newspaper. In December 2007, he was elected for a two-year term (2008–2009) as President of the All India Muslim Majlis-e-Mushawarat, the umbrella body of Muslim organisations in India. He has also been elected as the President of AIMMM for 2012 and re-elected for a further two-year term (2014-2015). In an interview to rediff.com he claimed there is  "no tangible proof of Muslims' involvement in terrorism" in India. In July 2017, he was appointed as Chairman for a three-year term of Delhi Minorities Commission, a quasi-judicial body to take care of the welfare and interests of the designated minorities in the Indian capital region. As chairman, Khan formed a fact-finding committee to report and suggest recommendations to Delhi Government about the 2020 Delhi riots.

Sedition Case
On 28 April 2020, Khan made a Facebook post arguing that Muslims in India were facing "hate campaigns, lynching and riots" by what he called were "Hindutva bigots". Khan also thanked Kuwait for its support for Indian Muslims. Facing backlash, he later apologized for the post, calling it ill-timed. However, based on a complaint, the Delhi Police charged Khan with sedition under Section 124A of the Indian Penal Code. A public statement in solidarity with Khan was signed by various notable figures including Swami Agnivesh, Gopal Menon, Kavita Krishnan and Annie Namala.

Two petitions filed in the Delhi High Court against him have been disposed on their first day of hearing, 5 May 2020 and 11 May 2020 respectively.

References

External links
 Dr Zafarul-Islam Khan, A Profile
 'Hindi media is either very secular or very communal' : Zafarul Islam Khan
 No room for terrorism in Islam By Zafarul-Islam Khan
 The Last Khutbah of the Prophet - (Khutbah means sermon)

Journalists from Uttar Pradesh
Indian newspaper editors
Indian Muslims
People from Azamgarh
Cairo University alumni
Al-Azhar University alumni
Alumni of the University of Manchester
1948 births
Living people
Urdu–Arabic translators
Indian male journalists